Katherine "Katty" Kay (born 14 November 1964) is a British-Swiss journalist, author and broadcaster. She presented BBC World News America and, with Christian Fraser, hosted Beyond 100 Days on BBC Four, BBC News and BBC World News. She has anchored BBC coverage of two Presidential elections. She also appears weekly on NBC News in Morning Joe.

Kay has co-written two books with ABC News correspondent Claire Shipman: Womenomics (2009) and The Confidence Code: The Science and Art of Self-Assurance—What Women Should Know (2014). Kay also co-hosted the podcast When Katty Met Carlos with OZY Media CEO Carlos Watson. She resigned from Ozy Media in September 2021 after a New York Times report raised questions about its business practices.

Kay is a board member at the International Women's Media Foundation.

Early life and education 

Kay was born in Wallingford in 1964 and grew up in Blewbury (then in Berkshire, now in Oxfordshire). She spent time in various Middle Eastern countries where her father was posted as a British diplomat. She studied modern languages at St Hilda's College, Oxford and speaks fluent French and Italian. She graduated with a Bachelor of Arts degree in 1988.

Career

After graduation, Kay briefly worked for the Bank of England. Deciding against a career in economics, she left to work for an aid agency in Zimbabwe.

A short time later, a friend, Matt Frei, came to her with a tape recorder and persuaded her to become a journalist. Kay joined the BBC in 1990 as Zimbabwe correspondent for the African section of the BBC World Service. She then returned to London to work for BBC World Service radio, before being posted to Tokyo for BBC News television in 1992 and then Washington, D.C., in 1996. Soon afterwards, she joined The Times news bureau, but returned to the BBC as a freelance journalist in 2002, based in the United States.

From June 2004, Kay co-presented the BBC World news bulletins with Mike Embley in London, shown on 230 public broadcast-television stations throughout the US and on BBC America. In October 2007, she became correspondent to presenter Matt Frei of BBC World's one-hour Washington-based news broadcast, BBC World News America. She anchored the show until June 2021.

Kay also makes frequent appearances as a guest panelist on  Morning Joe and Meet the Press on NBC, Real Time with Bill Maher on HBO, and in the past also appeared on The Chris Matthews Show, and Larry King Live on CNN. She occasionally substituted for Diane Rehm on The Diane Rehm Show on National Public Radio (NPR).

Kay anchored coverage of US Presidential Election nights across all BBC platforms in 2016 and 2020, on both occasions presenting with Andrew Neil. In 2021, she anchored the BBC's coverage of the Presidential inauguration of Joe Biden.

On 24 June 2021, Kay announced that the night's broadcast would be her last for the BBC. However, in March 2022 it was announced that Kay would return to the BBC  as US Special Correspondent for BBC Studios, working across documentaries, podcasts and news, as well as US Election Night anchor.

Remarks about terrorism in Europe

On 24 May 2017, Kay attracted criticism for stating that Europeans should "get used to" terrorist attacks. Speaking on MSNBC two days after the Manchester Arena bombing, she also argued that "we are never going to be able to totally wipe this out." UKIP leader Nigel Farage strongly condemned Kay's comments, stating "Never. If we accept this as a way of life that is giving in, it is appeasement, it is surrendering."

Personal life

Kay has been married since 1989 to ex-BBC reporter and current Head of Global Communications at the Carnegie Endowment for International Peace, Tom Carver. The couple have four children and live in Washington D.C. In 2021, she became a Swiss citizen. Her father, who died in January 2021, was Swiss.

Works

Claire Shipman and Katty Kay, Womenomics, (HarperBusiness, 2 June 2009) 
Katty Kay and Claire Shipman, The Confidence Code: The Science and Art of Self-Assurance—What Women Should Know,   ASIN: B00DB368AY

References

External links

BBC Press Office bio

Katty Kay on Twitter

Alumni of St Hilda's College, Oxford
BBC newsreaders and journalists
BBC World News
BBC World Service presenters
English expatriates in the United States
English journalists
English people of Swiss descent
Living people
MSNBC people
People from Wallingford, Oxfordshire
20th-century British journalists
21st-century British journalists
1964 births
Naturalised citizens of Switzerland